Chang Je-won (Korean: 장제원, born 13 April 1967) is a South Korean educator and conservative politician from the People Power Party (PPP). He has been serving as a Member of the National Assembly for Sasang District for 2 terms, from 2008 to 2012 and since 2016.

Early life and family background 
Chang was born in Dongrae District of Busan on 13 April 1967. His father, Chang Sŏng-man (1932–2015), was a pastor, educator who was the former chancellor of Dongseo University and also a politician served as an MP of Democratic Justice Party, the predecessor of LKP, from 1981 to 1988 and was also the Deputy Speaker of the National Assembly from 1987 to 1988. His mother, Park Dong-soon (1939-), is an educator and the former president and the incumbent chancellor of Dongseo University. His brother, Chang Je-kuk (1964-), is the current president of the university. He also has a sister named Chang Ju-young.

He married Han Yoon-soon, former broadcaster of MBC and has a son named Chang Yong-joon (2000-), or known as NO:EL, a former contestant of High School Rapper and now as a hip-hop rapper and singer.

Chang studied at Dongrae Primary School from his hometown, then moved to Seoul and continued his education at Yeouido Secondary School and Yeouido High School. After the graduation, he earned a bachelor's degree in Journalism and Broadcasting and also a master's degree in journalism and mass communication from Chung-Ang University.

Political career 
Chang was firstly elected for the National Assembly representing Sasang District in 2008 election, replacing the incumbent Kwon Cheol-hyun, who is also a father to Kwon Seong-ju. During the first MP career, he was a member of Public Administration and Security Committee, Steering Committee and Land, Transport and Maritime Affairs Committee. He also shortly served as the deputy parliamentary leader of Grand National Party, the predecessor of LKP, in June 2009.

He did not seek for second term in 2012 election. During this time, the ruling Saenuri Party underwent some conflicts in preselection, as the main opposition Democratic Unionist Party (DUP) selected Moon Jae-in, one of the potential presidential candidate at that time, for Sasang District. Instead of Chang, the Saenuri Party nominated Son Soo-joe, but was defeated by Moon.

Chang returned as an MP after the 2016 election. Originally, he intended to run under the Saenuri banner. After Son was re-selected, Chang left the party and won as a nonpartisan candidate. He then returned to the party on 21 June.

During the political scandal in the late 2016, Chang was one of hearing members from the Saenuri Party (LKP since February 2017) along with Kwon Seong-dong and Hwang Young-cheul. He then left the party with other 30 MPs and formed the Bareun Party. Nevertheless, prior to the presidential election in May 2017, he returned to the LKP and endorsed its presidential candidate, Hong Joon-pyo.

Controversy

Comment on police 
On 22 March 2018, Chang provoked a controversy when he called the police as "government's hounds infected with rabies" after they launched an investigation related to Kim Ki-hyun, the then Mayor of Ulsan, who was also a member of the LKP. He also asked to "hit the mad dogs". Regarding with this incident, several policemen condemned his statement and asked him to apologise.

Son issues 
Chang also faced criticisms regarding with his son, Chang Yong-joon (NO:EL), who performed on the show High School Rapper.

On 10 February 2017, after attending to High School Rapper, NO:EL faced a controversy that he was doing prostitution via his Twitter. It was also reported that his son was consuming cigarettes and alcohol underage. Chang apologised about it and resigned from his all positions within Bareun Party.

On 7 September 2019, NO:EL was caught by police nearby Mapo District in Seoul after his car hit a motorcycle. The police reported that NO:EL was driving under influence (DUI) with a Blood Alcohol Concentration (BAC) of 0.08%, which can lead to driving licence revocation. Chang apologised for this issue, however, the Justice Party urged him to resign as an MP should it is proven as true.

Election results

References

External links 
 Chang Je-won on Facebook
 Chang Je-won on Instagram
 Chang Je-won on YouTube

1967 births
Living people
Liberty Korea Party politicians
Chung-Ang University alumni
People from Busan